Carolina Alejandra Troncoso (born 28 January 1991) is an Argentine footballer who plays as a forward for Israeli Ligat Nashim club ASA Tel Aviv and the Argentina women's national team.

Club career
Troncoso has played for Boca Juniors in Argentina.

International career
Troncoso made her senior debut for Argentina on 8 April 2021 in a 0–0 friendly draw against Venezuela.

References

External links

1991 births
Living people
People from Quilmes
Sportspeople from Buenos Aires Province
Argentine women's footballers
Women's association football forwards
Boca Juniors (women) footballers
Atlético Junior footballers
ASA Tel Aviv University players
Ligat Nashim players
Argentina women's international footballers
Argentine expatriate women's footballers
Argentine expatriate sportspeople in Colombia
Expatriate women's footballers in Colombia
Argentine expatriate sportspeople in Israel
Expatriate women's footballers in Israel